Sultanuddin Ahmad (19028 April 1977) was a Bengali politician and diplomat who served as the Governor of East Pakistan.

Early life
Sultanuddin Ahmad was born in 1902 in Narsingdi, East Bengal. He graduated from Dhaka University in 1926.

Career
He started his law practice in Dhaka in 1927. He was a lecturer at Dhaka University's law department. He was also the Acting Vice Chancellor of the Dhaka University. He was a Public Prosecutor in East Pakistan. He was the Director and Deputy Chairman of the Dhaka Central Cooperative Bank and went on to become a director of State Bank of Pakistan for four years.

He was the assistant secretary of the Muslim League. In 1943 he was elected to the Bengal Legislative Assembly and served until 1947. He was appointed ambassador of Pakistan to Myanmar after the partition of India. In April 1955 he was appointed as  ambassador to China. On 26 April 1958 he appointed the governor of East Pakistan, taking his oath on the 3 May. Zakir Hossain succeeded him as the governor. From January 1959 to January 1964 he served as the ambassador of Pakistan to Indonesia. During 1964-65 he was part of Pakistan's delegation to the United Nations General Assembly.

Death
He died on 8 April 1977.

References

1902 births
1977 deaths
Governors of East Pakistan